The 2019 NOCA Men's Provincial Championship, the "provincial" men's curling championship of Northern Ontario was held from January 30 to February 2 at the Nipigon Curling Club in Nipigon, Ontario. The winning team of skip Brad Jacobs, third Ryan Fry, second E.J. Harnden and lead Ryan Harnden represented Northern Ontario at the 2019 Tim Hortons Brier in Brandon, Manitoba, Canada's national men's curling championship. The final was a rematch of the previous year's championship, with Jacobs prevailing once again. Team Jacobs defeated Team Horgan with a final score of 7-5. This was the 11th time that the rink represented Northern Ontario. The event was held in conjunction with the 2019 Northern Ontario Scotties Tournament of Hearts, Northern Ontario's women's championship.

Teams
Teams were as follows:

Round robin standings

Scores

January 30
Draw 1
Jacobs 4-2 McCarville
Horgan 8-4 Chandler

Draw 2
Horgan 5-3 Montpellier
Jacobs 10-4 Gordon
Johnston 9-7 Chandler
McCarville 7-4 Bonot

January 31
Draw 3
Bonot 10-5 Gordon 
Johnston 7-3 Montpellier

Draw 4
Bonot 11-7 Chandler  
McCarville 7-4 Johnston  
Jacobs 9-3 Montpellier 
Horgan 10-4 Gordon

Draw 5
Horgan 9-7 McCarville
Jacobs 7-1 Chandler

February 1
Draw 6
Jacobs 7-5 Johnston  
Horgan 4-2 Bonot
Gordon 7-5 McCarville   
Chandler 10-5 Montpellier

Draw 7
Bonot 11-6 Montpellier
Gordon 10-7 Johnston

Draw 8
Horgan 9-6 Jacobs
McCarville 6-5 Chandler

February 2
Draw 9
Chandler 9-7 Gordon
McCarville 9-3 Montpellier
Horgan 9-4 Johnston
Jacobs 9-1 Bonot

Draw 10
Gordon 8-4 Montpellier
Bonot 7-5 Johnston

Tiebreaker
McCarville 6-5 Bonot

Playoffs

Semifinal  
Sunday, February 3, 8:30am

Final 
Sunday, February 3, 5:30pm

References

2019 Tim Hortons Brier
Curling in Northern Ontario
Travelers Men's NOCA Provincials
NOCA Men's Provincial
NOCA Men's Provincial
Sport in Thunder Bay District